The European Speed Skating Championships are a series of long track speed skating events held annually to determine the best speed skaters of Europe.

History
The International Skating Union has organised the European Championships for Men since 1893 (unofficial Championships were held in the years 1891–1892) and the European Championships for Women since 1970. Since 1990, the men's and women's European Championships have been held at the same time and venue.

Starting in 2017, in odd years, the men's and women's European Sprint Speed Skating Championships are also held at the same time and venue. Starting in 2018, in even years, the men's and women's single distance championships are held instead of Allround and Sprint championships.

Medal winners

Allround and Sprint Championships (1891–2023)

Unofficial European Championships of 1891, 1892 and 1946 (not recognized by the ISU) included

Single Distance Championships (2018–2022)

Combined all-time medal count (1891–2023)

Unofficial European Championships of 1891, 1892 and 1946 (not recognized by the ISU) included

Multiple medalists
Boldface denotes active skaters and highest medal count among all skaters (including these who not included in these tables) per type.

Allround and Sprint Championships

All events

References

 
All-round speed skating
International speed skating competitions
European championships